Songül Lök (born 9 January 2002) is a Turkish compound archer.

Career
In 2022, she won the bronze medal in the women's team compound event at the European Indoor Archery Championships held in Laško, Slovenia. She won the silver medal in the women's U-21 team compound event at the Laško, Slovenia event in the 2022 European Indoor Archery Championships. She also won the silver medal in the women's individual compound event.

References

External links
 

2002 births
Living people
Turkish female archers
21st-century Turkish sportswomen